Goa, Daman & Diu Legislative Assembly election, 1967 was held in Indian Union territory of Goa, Daman and Diu in 1967, to elect 30 members to the Goa, Daman & Diu Legislative Assembly.

1967 Results 

|- align=center
!style="background-color:#E9E9E9" class="unsortable"|
!style="background-color:#E9E9E9" align=center|Political Party
!style="background-color:#E9E9E9" |Seats contested
!style="background-color:#E9E9E9" |Seats won
!style="background-color:#E9E9E9" |Number of Votes
!style="background-color:#E9E9E9" |% of Votes
|-
| 
|align="left"|Maharashtrawadi Gomantak Party||26||16||111,110||40.42%
|-
| 
|align="left"|United Goans Party (Sequeira Group)||30||12||104,426||37.98%
|-
| 
|align="left"|Independents||156||2||48,471||17.63%
|-
|
|align="left"|Total||226||30||274,92||
|-
|}

Winning candidates

1967

By Elections

References

External links

1967
1967 State Assembly elections in India
1960s in Goa, Daman, and Diu
1967